Bingles is an Australian sitcom which screened on the Ten Network in 1992 and 1993.

The series was set in a suburban smash repair workshop called Bingles, playing on the word bingle, which is also Australian slang for a minor crash or upset. Network Ten commissioned a second series of 13 episodes before the first series had gone to air, however the series was not very successful.

References

External links
Bingles at IMDb

Network 10 original programming
Australian television sitcoms
1992 Australian television series debuts
1993 Australian television series endings
Australian workplace comedy television series